Saadah  is an airport serving the town of Saada in Yemen.

See also
Transport in Yemen

References

External links
 OurAirports - Yemen
  Great Circle Mapper - Saadah
 Saadah

Airports in Yemen